Gerry Byrne may refer to:
Gerry Byrne (politician) (born 1966), Canadian politician
Gerry Byrne (footballer, born 1938) (1938–2015), English footballer with Liverpool
Gerry Byrne (footballer, born 1957), Scottish footballer with Cardiff City
Gerry Byrne, chairman of Bank Zachodni WBK

See also
Gerald G. Byrne (1890–1952), Newfoundland politician
Gerard Byrne (disambiguation)
Jerry Byrne (disambiguation)
Jerry Burns (1927–2021), American football coach